The Jacksonville Metropolitan Area, also called the First Coast, Metro Jacksonville, or Northeast Florida, is the metropolitan area centered on the principal city of Jacksonville, Florida and including the First Coast of North Florida. As of the 2020 United States census, the total population was 1,605,848. The Jacksonville–St. Marys–Palatka, FL–GA Combined Statistical Area (CSA) had a population of 1,733,937 in 2020 and was the 34th largest CSA in the United States. The Jacksonville metropolitan area is the 40th largest in the country and the fourth largest in the State of Florida, behind the Miami, Tampa, and Orlando metropolitan areas.

Definitions

Metropolitan Statistical Area (MSA)
The Jacksonville Metropolitan Statistical Area (MSA) is an area designated by the U.S. Office of Management and Budget used for statistical purposes by the United States Census Bureau and other government agencies. The metropolitan statistical area had a total population of approximately 1,605,848 as of 2020 and is the 39th largest in the United States and the fourth largest in the state of Florida. The OMB defines the Jacksonville MSA as consisting of five counties. The components of the metropolitan area with their estimated 2020 populations are listed below: 
Jacksonville metropolitan statistical area (1,605,848)
Duval County, Florida (995,567)
St. Johns County, Florida (273,425)
Clay County, Florida (218,245)
Nassau County, Florida (90,352)
Baker County, Florida (28,259)

Combined Statistical Area (CSA)
The OMB also defines a slightly larger region as a Combined Statistical Area (CSA). In 2012 the OMB also defined the Jacksonville–St. Marys–Palatka, FL–GA Combined Statistical Area, which included metropolitan Jacksonville as well as the Palatka, Florida and St. Marys, Georgia Micropolitan Statistical Areas (comprising Putnam County, Florida and Camden County, Georgia). The CSA had a population of 1,733,937 in 2020 and was the 34th largest CSA. The components of the CSA with their estimated 2020 populations are listed below:
Jacksonville, FL Metropolitan Area (1,733,937)
Palatka, FL Micropolitan area (73,464)
Putnam County, Florida (73,321)
St. Marys, GA Micropolitan area (53,044)
Camden County, Georgia (54,768)

Demographics

As of the census of 2010, there were 1,345,596 people, 524,146 households, and 350,483 families residing within the MSA. The racial makeup of the MSA was 69.9% White, 21.8% African American, 0.4%  Native American, 3.4% Asian, 0.1% Pacific Islander, 1.8% from other races, and 2.6% from two or more races. 12.9% were Hispanic or Latino of any race. The median income for a household in the MSA was $45,143, and the median income for a family was $51,327. Males had a median income of $35,537 versus $25,093 for females.

Education

Higher education

Higher education in the Jacksonville area is offered at many institutions. There are three public institutions in the area. University of North Florida (UNF), founded in 1969, is a public university in southeastern Jacksonville. It has over 17,000 students and offers a variety of bachelor's, master's, and doctoral programs. Florida State College at Jacksonville (FSCJ), is a public state college located in downtown Jacksonville with satellite campuses around the city. St. Johns River State College is a state college with campuses in St. Augustine, Orange Park, and Palatka. Many private schools are also located in the area. Edward Waters College, founded in 1866, is Jacksonville's oldest institution of higher education, as well as Florida's oldest historically black college. Jacksonville University (JU), established in 1934, is a private, four-year institution located along the St. Johns River with over 3,500 students. Flagler College is a liberal arts college located in St. Augustine. Noted for its campus, which includes Henry Flagler's former Ponce de León Hotel, it is currently included in The Princeton Review's Best 366 Colleges Rankings.

Public schools
The public school districts for Greater Jacksonville are all managed by school boards, with each county having its own board. The Duval County School Board is the largest in the area and the 22nd largest in the United States with over 155,000 students. In 2010, it was home to two of the top 20 high schools in the country, Stanton College Preparatory School and Paxon School for Advanced Studies. The St. Johns County School District, Clay County School District, Nassau County School District, and Baker County School District manage the public schools in their respective counties.

Transportation

Airports

Greater Jacksonville is served by one major airport – Jacksonville International Airport, which handled approximately 7.2 million passengers in 2019. The airport has three concourses with only two being operational. Concourse B was demolished in 2009 due to a significant decrease in passengers and flights. It is scheduled to be rebuilt when traffic increases at the airport, which was projected to happen in 2013. The airport has gone through many changes over the recent years. Both Concourse A and Concourse C were both rebuilt with ten gates each and moving walkways. Future plans call for expanding the newly built concourses by 2020 and possibly adding a people mover system to the airport, and connecting the airport with the onsite Clarion Hotel via a moving walkway.

Seaports

The Port of Jacksonville is located in Duval County on the St. Johns River and is operated by Jacksonville Port Authority, branded as JAXPORT. Over 100 countries import and export goods through the port. JAXPORT owns three cargo facilities: the Blount Island Marine Terminal, the Talleyrand Marine Terminal and the Dames Point Marine Terminal. The Port of Jacksonville imports the second largest amount of automobiles on the east coast. The port authority also operates a cruise terminal. Opened in 2003 as a "temporary" terminal, cruise ships have set sail from the 63,000-square foot facility ever since. Current cruises from Jacksonville visit the Bahamas on four- or five-day voyages aboard the Carnival Elation.

Public transportation

Jacksonville Transportation Authority (JTA) is the public transit agency serving the Jacksonville area with bus service, trolleys, paratransit, and a people mover. The people  mover, known as the JTA Skyway, is located in downtown Jacksonville, and operates 8 stations along a  track. Bus service as well as paratransit service is provided around Duval County and partially in Clay County. JTA operates three trolley lines in three different neighborhoods: Downtown, Riverside, and Jacksonville Beach. The entire JTA system has a daily ridership of over 42,000.

Roadways
The Jacksonville metropolitan area is served by four interstate highways operated by the Florida Department of Transportation (FDOT). I-95 runs north to south, starting in Nassau County and leaving in St. Johns County. I-10 runs west to east, terminating in downtown Jacksonville at I-95. This intersection is the busiest in the area, with more than 200,000 vehicles traveling it each day. I-295 serves as a beltway routing around the city and connects to I-10 and I-95 while serving all areas of Jacksonville. I-795 is a future expressway that will connect the southeastern section of I-295 with I-95.

Three other expressways also serve the area and are maintained by FDOT. Arlington Expressway (FL SR 115) connects downtown Jacksonville with the Arlington neighborhood via the Matthews Bridge and travels eastward to Atlantic Beach. The Commodore Point Expressway connects downtown Jacksonville with the Southside at Beach Boulevard (US 90), which continues eastward to Jacksonville Beach. Butler Bouleveard (SR 202) begins in southeast Jacksonville at Philips Highway (US 1) and ends in southern Jacksonville Beach at 3rd Street South (SR A1A). The road has become the one of the busiest roads in the metro area.

Interstates
 I-10
 I-95
 I-295
 Florida State Road 9B

U.S. Routes
 US 1
 U.S. Route 1 Alternate (Jacksonville, Florida)
 U.S. Route 1 Business (St. Augustine, Florida)
 US 17
 US 23
 US 90
 U.S. Route 90 Alternate (Jacksonville, Florida)
 US 301

State Highways
 SR A1A
 SR 2
 SR 5
 SR 5A
 SR 8
 SR 9
 SR 9A
 SR 9B
 SR 10
 SR 13
 SR 15
 SR 16
 SR 19
 SR 20
 SR 21
 SR 23
 SR 26
 SR 100
 SR 101
 SR 102
 SR 103
 SR 104
 SR 105
 SR 109
 SR 111
 SR 113
 SR 114
 SR 115
 SR 115A
 SR 116
 SR 117
 SR 121
 SR 122
 SR 126
 SR 128
 SR 129
 SR 134
 SR 139
 SR 152
 SR 200
 SR 202
 SR 206
 SR 207
 SR 208
 SR 210
 SR 211
 SR 212
 SR 224
 SR 228
 SR 228A
 SR 230
 SR 243
 SR 312

References

External links

 
Geography of Jacksonville, Florida
Metropolitan areas of Florida